Crazy Comets is a 1985 multidirectional shooter programmed by Simon Nicol for the Commodore 64 and published by Martech in 1985. The game is a clone of Gottlieb's 1983 Mad Planets arcade game, even using the same logo treatment with "Crazy" and "Comets" replacing "Mad" and "Planets" respectively. The two music tracks and the sound effects were produced by Rob Hubbard. Crazy Comets was followed by a 1987 sequel, also programmed by Nicol, Mega Apocalypse.

Reception
Zzap!64 praised the game for being an uncomplicated example of the genre. Happy Computer said the music alone was worth the price of admission.

References

External links

1985 video games
Commodore 64 games
Commodore 64-only games
Multidirectional shooters
Video game clones
Video games developed in the United Kingdom
Video games scored by Rob Hubbard
Martech games